Vesyolovsky District is an administrative and municipal district (raion), one of the forty-three in Rostov Oblast, Russia. It is located in the southern central part of the oblast. Its administrative center is the rural locality (a settlement) of Vesyoly. Population: 26,165 (2010 Census);  The population of Vesyoly accounts for 35.1% of the district's total population.

References

Notes

Sources

Districts of Rostov Oblast